Robert Cameron (April 21, 1911 – November 10, 2009) was a famed American photographer and author of numerous books featuring aerial photographs of numerous cities throughout the globe. He also invented a fad diet known as the Drinking Man's Diet.

Works
Cameron's book style consists of an aerial photograph with text and history of the site and occasionally on the opposing page a historical photo of the same site with text. The books are always all photographic and are primarily of large conurbations. His career began as a photographic journalist for the Des Moines Register in 1933. During the Second World War he worked as a photographer for the United States Department of War. He founded the publishing company Cameron and Company in 1964 with the publication of The Drinking Man's Diet, which went on to sell over 2.4 million copies worldwide in 13 different languages. His books of aerial photography include:
 Above San Francisco
 Above New York
 Above Paris
 Above London
 Above Mexico City 
 Above Las Vegas
 Above Chicago
 Above Los Angeles
 Above Washington
 Above Seattle
 Above San Diego
 Above Carmel
 Above Mackinac
 Above Yosemite
 Above Tahoe
 Above Alcatraz
 Above Petoskey
 Above Harbor Springs
 Above Makinak Island

In the 1991 film Defending Your Life, Cameron's books can be seen sitting on a coffee table, one of which features the film's fictitious city, Judgement City.

Drinking Man's Diet

Cameron was known for a fad diet he invented known as the Drinking Man's Diet. In 1964, he promoted the diet in his booklet The Drinking Man’s Diet: How to Lose Weight with a Minimum of Willpower. The diet became popular and sold over 2.4 million copies in 13 languages. The Drinking Man's Diet was a low-carb high-fat diet with plenty of meat and alcohol.

It has been described as a predecessor to the Atkins diet and the Paleolithic diet. A 1965 article in the Time Magazine, noted that "the book's contents are a cocktail of wishful thinking, a jigger of nonsense and a dash of sound advice." Nutritionists such as Jean Mayer and Frederick J. Stare found the diet "ridiculous" and criticized it as unhealthy. Dr. Philip L. White from the American Medical Association described the diet as "utter nonsense, has no scientific basis, and is chock-full of errors."

References

External links
 Robert Cameron Portfolio Official Site,
 Robert Cameron Official Site,

1911 births
2009 deaths
20th-century American photographers
High-fat diet advocates